Mohammed Abduz Zaher ( –  27 August 2017) was a Bangladeshi geologist. He was the director general of Geological Survey of Bangladesh.

Biography
Zaher described a new mineral in his M.S. Thesis of Michigan Technological University in 1969 that he investigated from Salt Range, Pakistan. The mineral was named after him as zaherite by International Mineralogical Association in 1977. He was the director general of Geological Survey of Bangladesh. He was a teacher of Dhaka University's soil science department too. He provided technical and strategic support to the freedom fighters during the Liberation War of Bangladesh.

Zaher died on 27 August 2017 at the age of 85.

Selected publications
 Zaher, M. A. (1963). Peat deposit of Kola Moza, Khulna, East Pakistan
 Ahmed, W., and Zaher, M. A., (1965). Paharpur Gondwana coalfield and subsurface geology of Rajshahi Division, East Pakistan
 Zaher, M. A. (1969). A study of the clays of the Salt Range and Kala-Chitta Hills, West Pakistan Rahman, M. M. and Zaher, M. A., (1980). Prospects and investigations for minerals in the northern part of Bangladesh, in Petroleum and mineral resources of Bangladesh Zaher, M. A., Alam,  M. K., Arifur Rahman, Q. M. and Chowdhury, S. I. (1986). Subsurface Geology of the Limestone Deposits of Jaypurhat Area, Jaypurhat District, Bangladesh''

References

Academic staff of the University of Dhaka
2017 deaths
1930s births
Bangladeshi geologists
Michigan Technological University alumni
People from Brahmanbaria district